Saadia ben Abraham Longo was a Turkish Hebrew poet, who lived in Constantinople in about the middle of the sixteenth century. 

Some of Longo's dirges were published under the title Shivre Luḥot (Salonica, 1594). To them is prefixed a chronicle of Jewish writers and their works, entitled Seder Zemannim. Longo wrote, besides, poems on many works of his contemporaries; these poems are printed at the beginning of the works to which they refer.

References
 

16th-century Jews from the Ottoman Empire
Hebrew-language poets
Jewish poets
Turkish Jews
Writers from Constantinople